Xolani Dlwati  was Dean of Johannesburg from December 2015 until the 27th of November 2022.

He was born in Soweto and educated at the University of South Africa. He was Rector of St Monnica's Church, Midrand then Archdeacon of Randfontein. He has served as the 18th Dean of the diocese of Johannesburg, South Africa

Notes

University of South Africa alumni
Anglican archdeacons in Africa
Living people
Deans of Johannesburg
People from Soweto
Year of birth missing (living people)